Ketterman is an extinct town in the remote Smoke Hole Canyon of Pendleton County, West Virginia, USA. It was near the present day Big Bend Campground of the Spruce Knob–Seneca Rocks National Recreation Area (a unit of the Monongahela National Forest).

Mentions
Fiction: Lux and Origin Series by Jennifer L. Armentout

References

Unincorporated communities in Pendleton County, West Virginia
Unincorporated communities in West Virginia